Sokar may refer to:

Seker, a falcon god in Egyptian mythology
Sokar (Stargate), a character in television series Stargate
Sokar (yacht) (formally the Jonikal), a yacht owned by Mohamed Al-Fayed